Mehdi Belhaj Kacem (born 17 April 1973, Paris) is a French-Tunisian actor, philosopher, and writer.

Biography
Mehdi Belhaj Kacem was born in Paris on April 17, 1973. He lived in Tunisia until he was 13. He was nominated for  the Prix Michel Simon Acteurs à l'Écran award for Best Actor for his part in the 2001 film Wild Innocence.

Kacem has had a number of his essays and articles translated into English. In 2014, his book Transgression and the Inexistent: A Philosophical Vocabulary was the first of his books to appear in English translation.

Filmography
1995:To Have (or not)
2001: Wild Innocence, winner of the FIPRESCI Prize at the Venice Film Festival
2007: La Petite souris (short)

Novels
 1994 : Cancer, éd. Tristram, col. « J'ai lu »/Nouvelle génération n°5153. 
 1994 : 1993,  éd. Tristram. 
 1996 : Vies et morts d'Irène Lepic, éd. Tristram.

Books
 1997 : L'Antéforme, éd. Tristram. 
 2000 : Esthétique du chaos, éd. Tristram. 
 2001 : Society, éd. Tristram. 
 2001 : Essence n de l'amour, éd. Fayard/Tristram. 
 2002 : Théorie du trickster, avec EvidenZ, Sens et Tonka éditeurs. 
 2002 : De la communauté virtuelle, avec EvidenZ, Sens et Tonka éditeurs. 
 2002 : La Chute de la démocratie médiatico-parlementaire Sens et Tonka éditeurs. 
 2004 : Événement et Répétition, préface d'Alain Badiou, éd. Tristram. 
 2004 : L'Affect, éd. Tristram. 
 2004 : eXistenZ, éd. Denoël. 
 2004 : Pop philosophie, entretiens avec Philippe Nassif, éd. Denoël. 
 2006 : La Psychose française, les banlieues : le ban de la République, éd. Gallimard. 
 2006 : Incipit « L'Esprit du nihilisme », éd. Ikko. 
 2007 : Manifeste antiscolastique, Nous éditions. 
 2009 : Ironie et vérité, Nous éditions. 
 2009 : L'esprit du nihilisme, une ontologique de l'Histoire, éd. Fayard. 
 2010 : Inesthétique et mimésis. Badiou, Lacoue-Labarthe et la question de l'art, éd. Lignes. 
 2011 : Après Badiou, éd. Grasset. 
 2020 :SYSTÈME DU PLÉONECTIQUE éd.Diaphanes.

References

External links
An overview of MBK's philosophy

1973 births
Living people
French male film actors
Male actors from Paris